The Vanderhall Laguna is a three-wheeled roadster produced by the American vehicle manufacturer Vanderhall Motor Works from 2016 to 2018.

History 
The Laguna debuted in March 2016 as the first vehicle in the history of Vanderhall. The car took the form of the so-called autocycle, being a tricycle which combined the features of a motorcycle with a sports car.

Production and sales of Laguna in the United States began in July 2016, with a price of $49,950 for the cheapest variant and $77,000 for the top variant. The hand-made roadster was manufactured at Vanderhall's primary facility in Provo, Utah.

Specifications

The luxuriously decorated passenger cabin made it possible to accommodate two passengers, adapting numerous interior design elements, such as steering wheel from the then General Motors models. The Vanderhall Laguna is a front-wheel drive car powered by a 1.5 L SGE turbo I4 engine.

References 

Roadsters
Three-wheeled motor vehicles
Cars introduced in 2016
Cars discontinued in 2018
First car made by manufacturer
Laguna
Front-wheel-drive vehicles